Jake Francis Morris (born March 3, 1999) is an American soccer player who currently plays for MLS club Columbus Crew.

Career
Morris began his youth career with Weston FC in Florida before joining the Seattle Sounders FC academy in 2016.  On August 20, 2016, Morris made his debut for USL club Seattle Sounders FC 2 in a 2–0 defeat to San Antonio FC.

International
Morris also represented the United States in the U19 level.

Honors
Columbus Crew 2
MLS Next Pro: 2022

References

External links

U.S. Soccer Development Academy bio (Seattle Sounders FC)
U.S. Soccer Development Academy bio (Weston FC)
U.S. Soccer bio
Top Drawer Soccer bio
NJCAA bio
Tyler Junior College bio

1999 births
Living people
American soccer players
Tacoma Defiance players
Association football defenders
Soccer players from Florida
Sportspeople from Fort Lauderdale, Florida
USL Championship players
United States men's youth international soccer players
United States men's under-20 international soccer players
Tyler Apaches men's soccer players
Campbell Fighting Camels soccer players
USL League Two players
Weston FC players
Columbus Crew players
Homegrown Players (MLS)
Columbus Crew 2 players
MLS Next Pro players